P. Palaniappan is an Indian politician and former Minister of Higher Education and Member of the Legislative Assembly of Tamil Nadu from Pappireddipatti constituency.  He is former Deputy General Secretary of  Amma Makkal Munnetra Kazhagam party.

He was one of hardworking persons in the Ministry during the period 2011-2016. He is most help to the Tamil Nadu Government Higher Education and the 18 members who were disqualified by Speaker P. Dhanapal as they withdrew support to Chief Minister Edappadi K. Palaniswami and became loyal to rebel leader T.T.V. Dhinakaran and joined his party Amma Makkal Munnetra Kazhagam. On July 3rd 2021, he joined DMK.

References 

Tamil Nadu MLAs 2011–2016
All India Anna Dravida Munnetra Kazhagam politicians
Living people
State cabinet ministers of Tamil Nadu
Tamil Nadu MLAs 2016–2021
Year of birth missing (living people)
Dravida Munnetra Kazhagam politicians